Farzad Mohammadi is an Iranian footballer who plays for Machine Sazi in the Iran Pro League.

References

External links
 Farzad Mohammadi at IranLeague
 Farzad Mohammadi at PersianLeague
 Farzad Mohammadi at IRIFF

1987 births
Living people
Iranian footballers
People from Urmia
Sanat Mes Kerman F.C. players
Damash Gilan players
Machine Sazi F.C. players
Association football forwards